Eastern Christian College or ECC was a co-educational, private Christian college that was located in Bel Air, Maryland, United States. It was supported by Christian churches and churches of Christ, which is part of the Restoration Movement.

History 
Eastern Christian College was established in 1946 as Eastern Christian Institute in East Orange, New Jersey.  It moved to its final location in Bel Air, Maryland in 1960 and was renamed Eastern Christian College.  Its history was marked by significant financial struggles.  ECC merged with Lincoln Christian University in 1993 and was renamed Lincoln Christian College East Coast in an attempt to stabilize its fiscal troubles.  While marginally successful, ECC ceased operations and closed in 2005.  Its remaining funds, library holdings, and equipment were absorbed by Mid-Atlantic Christian University.  A plurality of the active students also transferred to Mid-Atlantic Christian University.

Campus 

ECC's former Bel Air, Maryland campus was located on the Fair Meadows estate, which is listed on the National Register of Historical Places.

Academics 

Eastern Christian College awarded Bachelor's and Associate's degrees during its operation.  Its academic records are now archived at Mid-Atlantic Christian University.

References

External links
 Mid-Atlantic Christian University site

Bel Air, Harford County, Maryland
Bible colleges
Defunct private universities and colleges in Maryland
Universities and colleges affiliated with the Christian churches and churches of Christ
Educational institutions established in 1946
1946 establishments in Maryland
2005 disestablishments in Maryland